Ponceau 6R, or Crystal ponceau 6R, Crystal scarlet, Brilliant crystal scarlet 6R, Acid Red 44, or C.I. 16250, is a red azo dye. It is soluble in water and slightly soluble in ethanol. It was used as a food dye, formerly having E number E126. It is also used in histology, for staining fibrin with the MSB Trichrome stain. It usually comes as disodium salt.

Amaranth is a closely related azo dye, also usable in trichrome staining.

References

Azo dyes
Food colorings
Staining dyes
Naphthalenesulfonates
2-Naphthols
Acid dyes